The Hiuchi class support ship is designed to provide Auxiliary Multi-purpose Support (AMS) for the Japanese Maritime Self-Defense Force (JMSDF).

The Hiuchi AMS class replaced the Auxiliary Service Utility class (ASU). The primary mission of these vessels is to support training exercises of other ships, including shooting practice and torpedo launching practice.

Ships in the class

{| class=wikitable
|-
!Pennant No. || Name ||Home port||Shipyard|| Laid down || Launched || Commissioned
|-
|AMS-4301 || Hiuchi ||Maizuru || Mitsui, Tamano 
|| 18 Jan 2001  ||4 Sept 2001 ||27 March 2002
|-
|AMS-4302 || Suo || Ominato||Universal, Keihin
|| 19 Sept 2002 || 25 April 2003||16 March 2004
|-
|AMS-4303 || Amakusa  || Sasebo ||Universal, Keihin 
||3 Dec 2002 || 6 Aug 2003 ||16 March 2004
|-
|AMS-4304<ref name="werth">Werth, Eric. (2007). {{Google books|TJunjRvplU4C|Naval Institute Guide to Combat Fleets of the World, p. 392.|page=392}}</ref> ||Genkai||Kure  ||Universal, Keihin 
||7 Nov 2006 ||24 May 2007||20 Feb 2008  
|-
|AMS-4305 || Enshu  || Yokosuka || Universal, Keihin  
||19 Dec 2006||9 Aug 2007 ||20 Feb 2008  
|}

Notes

References
 Werth, Eric. (2007). Naval Institute Guide to Combat Fleets of the World: Their Ships, Aircraft, and Systems.''  Annapolis: Naval Institute Press. ;

External links
  多用途支援艦「ひうち」型
 Ministry of Defense,  Press Conference by the Defense Minister (11:11-11:26 A.M. March 25, 2011)

 
Auxiliary training ship classes